The Leducq Foundation (aka Fondation Leducq) is a private foundation based in Paris, France.  Its mission is to improve human health through international efforts to combat cardiovascular and neurovascular disease.

The foundation’s principal grant program, the Transatlantic Networks of Excellence for Cardiovascular and Neurovascular Research, promotes internationally collaborative basic and transnational research. Scientists supported under this program work together to further the knowledge of cardiovascular and neurovascular disease with an aim towards improving outcomes for patients.  Originally limited to investigators from Europe and North America, the Transatlantic Networks Program is, as of 2011, open to cardiovascular and neurovascular scientists worldwide.

The Fondation Leducq is constituted according to French law, having a self-perpetuating Board of Directors made up of nine members, and an observer appointed by the Minister of the Interior. Responsibility for evaluating the scientific merit of all funding requests made to the foundation lies with the Scientific Advisory Committee (SAC), which is composed equally of North American and European members who are experts in cardiology, cardiac surgery, and neurovascular medicine.

As of 2015, the Fondation Leducq has distributed or committed more than $300 million to support cardiovascular and neurovascular research.  The majority of the foundation’s expenditures have been for the Transatlantic Network Program, which has made 43 awards to hundreds of researchers in 18 countries: Australia, Austria, Belgium, Canada, the Czech Republic, Denmark, Finland, France, Germany, Israel, Italy, Mexico, the Netherlands, Spain, Sweden, Switzerland, the United Kingdom and the United States.

History
Jean Leducq was a French entrepreneur who over the course of 50 years built a successful international business in Europe and North America around the supply and care of linens and uniforms.  Shortly before the sale of this business, which included the group ELIS in France, Jean, with his wife Sylviane, created the French Fondation Leducq, which was officially recognized by the French government in November 1996.

After Jean Leducq died in 2002, Sylviane Leducq carried on the work of the foundation as President of the Board of Directors. She oversaw the implementation of the Transatlantic Networks Program, and the development of the venture philanthropy program Broadview Ventures, Inc. In 2009, Sylviane Leducq was awarded the French Légion d’Honneur in recognition of her generosity and leadership of the foundation.   Her work helped to assure that, following her death in 2013, the foundation would continue to remain true to its mission in cardiovascular and neurovascular research.

Science
Research projects currently funded by the Leducq Foundation span the major areas of cardiovascular and neurovascular disease, including coronary artery disease, heart failure, stroke, cardiac arrhythmias, hypertension, valvular heart disease and congenital heart disease.

Recently, Leducq researchers have played prominent roles in the identification and characterization of cardiac stem cells, and in the demonstration of the clinical utility of remote ischemic preconditioning in patients with acute myocardial infarction. Leducq network investigators have contributed to the understanding of vascular malformations and hemorrhagic stroke, identified Calcium Calmodulin Kinase II as a critical node in signaling pathways in atrial fibrillation and heart failure, assessed the pathophysiological role and therapeutic potential of microRNAs in heart disease, provided new models of mitral valve disease, and implicated pericytes in the persistence of diminished in blood flow following a stroke.

Structure
The bequest from the Leducq family includes the Napa Valley, California, vineyard Ehlers Estate, which supports the foundation’s philanthropic mission. In 2008, the trust of the Leducq Foundation created a new company, Broadview Ventures, Inc., with an aim to accelerate the development of early-stage technology for the diagnosis and treatment of cardiovascular and neurovascular disease through targeted investment. Although associated with the Leducq Foundation, with which it shares an overlap of mission and philosophy, Broadview Ventures is constituted as an independent, for-profit corporation on a venture philanthropy model. Profits from this company must be used for further targeted investment through Broadview Ventures, or for Leducq Foundation grant funding.  Broadview Ventures is designed to help overcome the problem of the so-called "translation gap," where very early-stage companies find that their research is too advanced for traditional academic funding, but not sufficiently developed to attract conventional venture capital or other early-stage investment. As of 2015, Broadview Ventures has made 22 early-stage investments in diagnostics, therapeutics, devices, and regenerative medicine technology relating to cardiovascular and neurovascular disease.

References

External links
 Leducq Foundation
 Broadview Ventures
 Ehlers Estate
 ELIS

Foundations based in France
French medical research